The Leptodactylinae are a subfamily of leptodactylid frogs distributed between southern North America (Texas, USA, and Sonora, Mexico) and South America to Brazil. Their sister taxon is the clade comprising the Leiuperinae and Paratelmatobiinae.

Genera
The four genera in the subfamily are:
 Adenomera Steindachner, 1867
 Hydrolaetare Gallardo, 1963
 Leptodactylus Fitzinger, 1826
 Lithodytes Fitzinger, 1843

References

 
Taxa named by Franz Werner
Amphibian subfamilies

es:Leptodactylinae